Bonwm Halt (Pron: Bon-oom) in Denbighshire, Wales, was a minor station on the Ruabon to Barmouth line.

Situated on the south side of the line alongside the A5, it was of timber construction and only about one carriage length long. It was to have closed to passengers on 18 January 1965 but closed prematurely on 14 December 1964 due to flood damage.

There was a timber waiting shelter and a dual sided nameboard so the halt's name could also be seen from the road. There was never a signal box, passing place nor freight facilities here. At that time, two trains per day stopped at the halt, conveying two boys to the Grammar School at Bala and returning them in the evening.

Today just a few wooden supports survive of the platform edge.

Work started in 2011 by the Llangollen Railway Preservation Society to rebuild the line between Carrog and Corwen. By 2013 the line had been relaid up to the site of Bonwm Halt, though there are no plans to rebuild the platform and shelter. By spring 2014 the relaying work had reached the outskirts of Corwen and in October 2014 the new station at  saw its first passengers.

On Saturday 22 June 2013 the first train reach the former site of Bonwm Halt was former Arriva Bubble 121032 (55032) on loan for the DMU Gala Weekend from Chiltern. This means that Llangollen Rail managed to reach their goal ahead of schedule.

Services

References

Sources

Further reading

External links 
 Bonwm halt on navigable 1946 O.S. map

Beeching closures in Wales
Railway stations in Great Britain opened in 1935
Railway stations in Great Britain closed in 1964
Disused railway stations in Denbighshire
Former Great Western Railway stations
Corwen